Donal O'Shea (born 2001) is an Irish hurler. At club level, he plays with Salthill-Knocknacarra, while he is also a member of the Galway senior hurling team. He usually lines out as a forward.

Career

O'Shea first played hurling at juvenile and underage levels with the Salthill-Knocknacarra club, before eventually progressing to the adult level. He enjoyed his first success in 2021 when Salthill claimed the Galway JHC title. O'Shea later claimed a Conancht JCHC title after a defeat of Easkey in the final. He has also lined out with University College Dublin in the Fitzgibbon Cup.

O'Shea first appeared at inter-county level with Galway as full-forward on the minor team that won the All-Ireland MHC title in 2018. As well as being Galway's top scorer, he was also named GAA Minor Star Hurler of the Year. O'Shea spent two years with the under-20 team and was again the team's top scorer when Galway were beaten by Cork in the 2021 All-Ireland under-20 final.

O'Shea made his first appearance for the senior team during the 2023 Walsh Cup.

Personal life

His father, Eamon O'Shea, played hurling with Tipperary and Dublin and also served as Tipperary manager.

Career statistics

Honours

Salthill-Knocknacarra
Connacht Junior Club Hurling Championship: 2021
Galway Junior Hurling Championship: 2021

Galway
Leinster Under-20 Hurling Championship: 2021
All-Ireland Minor Hurling Championship: 2019

References

2001 births
Living people
Salthill-Knocknacarra hurlers
UCD hurlers
Galway inter-county hurlers